The Great Secret is a 1917 silent film adventure serial directed by Christy Cabanne and starring Francis X. Bushman and Beverly Bayne. It was produced independently by Louis B. Mayer and released through Metro Pictures. Mayer's first production credit.

It is now lost.

Cast
Francis X. Bushman - William Montgomery Strong
Beverly Bayne - Beverly Clarke
Fred R. Stanton - The Great Master
Edward Connelly - Dr. Eulph
Tom Blake - Bull Whalen
Helen Dunbar - Jane Warren
Sue Balfour - Mrs. Clarke
Belle Bruce - Sava Laring
Dorothy Haydel - Eunice Manton
William J. Butler - Tom Clarke
Charles Ripley - The Spider
Artie Ortego - The Rat
Charles Fang
Tammany Young
Jack J. Clark - Beverly's uncle

References

External links
The Great Secret @ IMDb.com

2 part ad page

1917 films
American silent serial films
Films directed by Christy Cabanne
Lost American films
American black-and-white films
American adventure films
1917 adventure films
1917 lost films
Lost adventure films
1910s American films
Silent adventure films